Zoltan Elek is a makeup artist who won the 1985 Academy Award for Best Makeup for the film Mask, shared with colleague Michael Westmore.
He also was the creator for the makeup of Max Headroom.

Selected filmography

Fast & Furious (2009)
Live Free or Die Hard (2007)
The Black Dahlia (2006)
The Terminal (2004)
Star Trek: Nemesis (2002)
Dr. Seuss' How the Grinch Stole Christmas (2000)
Rules of Engagement (2000)
Fight Club (1999)
Independence Day (1996) (As Zoltan)
Street Fighter (1994) (as Zoltan)
Hard Target (1993) (as Zoltan)The Fisher King (1991)Indiana Jones and the Last Crusade (1989)Alien Nation (1988) (as Zoltan)Mask'' (1985) (as Zoltan)

References

External links

Best Makeup Academy Award winners
Living people
Year of birth missing (living people)
Make-up artists